Julian Raymond is an American songwriter and music producer. He has worked with various music artists, including Insane Clown Posse, Glen Campbell, Cheap Trick, Jennifer Nettles, Fastball, Albert Lee, Fleetwood Mac, Kottonmouth Kings, among others. Raymond has been a longtime producer for numerous albums for Cheap Trick.

He co-wrote and produced song "I'm Not Gonna Miss You" for the soundtrack to the documentary Glen Campbell: I'll Be Me (2014). The song was nominated for Best Original Song at the 87th Academy Awards; the nomination was shared with Glen Campbell. It also won Grammy Award for Best Country Song, and received additional nomination for Best Song Written for Visual Media.

Selected discography
  "I'm Not Gonna Miss You" (song by Glen Campbell)  Producer and writer
 Bang, Zoom, Crazy... Hello (album by Cheap Trick)  Producer and writer
 The Latest (album by Cheap Trick)  Producer and writer
 Rockford (album by Cheap Trick)  Producer and writer
 "Cold Turkey" (song by Cheap Trick)  Producer
 It's About Time (album by Hank Williams Jr.)  Producer
 See You There (album by Glen Campbell)  Producer, vocals, engineer, writer
 Ghost on the Canvas (album by Glen Campbell)  Producer, vocals, writer
 Odd Soul (album by Mutemath)  Producer
 "Positive Vibes" (song by Kottonmouth Kings)  Producer
 "I Started a Joke" (song by The Wallflowers)  Producer
 The Harsh Light of Day (album by Fastball)  Producer
 All the Pain Money Can Buy (album by Fastball)  Producer
 Steal This Record (album by The Suicide Machines)  Producer
 The Suicide Machines (album by The Suicide Machines)  Producer
 Battle Hymns (album by The Suicide Machines)  Producer
 Destruction by Definition (album by The Suicide Machines)  Producer
 In the Meantime, In Between Time (album by The Party)  Producer
 "Rodeo" (song by The Party)  Producer and writer
 "I Wanna Be Your Boyfriend" (song by The Party)  Producer
 Bigger (album by Sugarland)  Producer

References 

American country record producers
Living people
Year of birth missing (living people)